South Korea-based girl group Girls' Generation have released ten studio albums (three of which were reissued under different titles), two live albums, four extended plays (EPs), and twenty-eight singles. As of November 2012, Girls' Generation has sold over 4.4 million albums and 30 million digital singles. The group has sold over 1.74 million albums in South Korea as of December 2014, and 3.48 million records, including over 945,000 physical singles and 1.9 million albums in Japan as of January 2017.

Girls' Generation debuted in 2007 with the single "Into the New World" and their self-titled studio album, which was later re-released as Baby Baby in 2008. The album spawned three more singles: "Girls' Generation", "Kissing You", and "Baby Baby". In 2009, Girls' Generation released two EPs: Gee and Genie. The single "Gee" was the best-selling single of 2009 in South Korea. In 2010, the group released their second studio album Oh!, its reissue Run Devil Run, and their third EP, Hoot. All three records reached number one in South Korea and were among the highest-selling albums of the year. The singles "Oh!", "Run Devil Run" and "Hoot" all peaked atop South Korea's singles chart.

Girls' Generation debuted in Japan with the re-recorded versions of their singles "Genie" and "Gee". The latter reached number one on the Oricon Daily Singles Chart, making Girls' Generation the first non-Japanese Asian girl group to do so. Their first Japanese-language album, Girls' Generation (2011), was certified million by the Recording Industry Association of Japan (RIAJ) and became the highest-selling album by a Korean girl group in Japan. Their first original Japanese song, "Mr. Taxi", reached number one on the Japan Hot 100. Girls' Generation's third Korean and fourth studio album, The Boys (2011), was the best-selling album of the year in South Korea. The title track reached number one in South Korea.

The group's second Japanese studio album and fifth overall, Girls & Peace (2012), spawned the singles "Oh!", "Paparazzi" and "Flower Power". Girls' Generation's fourth Korean studio album, I Got a Boy (2013), reached number one in South Korea. Its singles "Dancing Queen", a remake of English singer Duffy's "Mercy", and title track "I Got a Boy" both charted atop South Korean singles chart. The group's third Japanese studio album and seventh overall, Love & Peace (2013), reached number one in Japan and spawned the singles "Love & Girls" and "Galaxy Supernova". Their fourth EP, Mr.Mr., and its titular single were released in 2014; both reached number one on South Korea's albums and singles charts.

The greatest hits album The Best (2014) made Girls' Generation the first Korean girl group to have three number-one albums in Japan. Girls' Generation's single "Catch Me If You Can" (2015) was their first release since member Jessica left the group in September 2014. The group's fifth Korean studio album Lion Heart, released in 2015, peaked atop the South Korean albums chart and produced three singles: "Party", "Lion Heart" and "You Think". Their sixth Korean studio album Holiday Night was released in 2017 to commemorate their tenth anniversary. It peaked at number two in South Korea and yielded two singles: "All Night" and "Holiday". Their seventh Korean studio album Forever 1 was released in 2022, five years after the release of Holiday Night, to commemorate their fifteenth anniversary. It peaked at number two in South Korea and produced a top-five single "Forever 1", Girls' Generation's first top-five single in six years.

Albums

Studio albums

Reissues

Live albums

Compilation albums

Video albums

Extended plays

Singles

Promotional singles

Other charted songs

Other appearances

See also
 Girls' Generation videography

Notes

References

External links
 Girls' Generation Korean discography  on SM Entertainment
 Girls' Generation Japanese discography on Universal Music Japan

Discography
Discographies of South Korean artists
K-pop music group discographies